Supporting Wall was an award-winning London-based theatre and general arts production, promotion and management company, founded in 2008 by producers Ben Monks and Will Young and operated for nine years until 2017. The company's own productions primarily focused on new writing and contemporary theatre, while management and publicity work has included projects across theatre, comedy, film, festivals, live music and dance - including work at the BFI Southbank, Royal National Theatre and many others. During most of this time, Ben Monks and Will Young were also based at the Actors Centre as creative producers for the Tristan Bates Theatre.

Productions
Supporting Wall's original productions include:

Awards and nominations
Supporting Wall's productions won or were nominated for various awards, including for Bull the 2015 Olivier Award for Achievement in an Affiliate Theatre; for Dark Vanilla Jungle a Fringe First Award and a nomination for lead actress Gemma Whelan for the Stage Award for Best Solo Performance; for Tender Napalm, winning the OffWestEnd.Com Award for Best Actress for Vinette Robinson and a nomination for the Evening Standard Outstanding Newcomer Award for director David Mercatali; for Shallow Slumber, nominations for the OffWestEnd.Com Best Actress Award for both Amy Cudden and Alexandra Gilbreath, as well as for Best New Play at the same awards; and for The Jewish Wife, winning the JMK director's award for Matthew Evans.

For Supporting Wall Ben Monks and Will Young were jointly nominated for the OffWestEnd.Com Best Producer Award twice consecutively in 2011 & 2012.

References

External links
Supporting Wall official site

Theatre production companies